Thomas A. Reh Ph.D. is an American scientist and author.

He received his B.Sc. in Biochemistry from the University of Illinois at Urbana-Champaign in 1977 and his Ph.D. in Neuroscience from the University of Wisconsin–Madison in 1981. He went on to postdoctoral studies at Princeton University in the lab of Martha Constantine-Paton. He is currently Professor of Biological Structure and former Director of the Neurobiology and Behavior Program at the University of Washington.

The overall goal of Dr. Reh’s research is to understand the cell and molecular biology of regeneration in the eye. He has worked at the interface between development and regeneration, focusing on the retina. The lab is currently divided into a team that studies retinal development and a team that studies retinal regeneration, with the goal of applying the principles learned from developmental biology to design rationale strategies for promoting retinal regeneration in the adult mammalian retina.

His research has been funded through numerous grants from the National Institutes of Health (NIH) and many private foundations, and he has served on several national and international grant review panels, including NIH study sections, and is currently a member of the Scientific Advisory Board of the Foundation Fighting Blindness and of a start-up biotechnology company, Acucela. He has received several awards for his work, including the AHFMR and Sloan Scholar awards. He has published over 100 journal articles, reviews and books, nearly all in the field of retinal regeneration and development.

References
Microglia suppress Ascl1-induced retinal regeneration in mice. Todd, L., Finkbeiner, C., Wong, C.K., Hooper, M.J. Reh, T.A. Cell Reports. 2020 Dec 15; 33 (11): 108507. PMID 33326790

Developmental changes in the accessible chromatin, transcriptome and Ascl1-binding correlate with the loss in Müller Glial regenerative potential. Vandenbosch, L.V., Wohl, S.G, Wilken, M.S., Hooper, M.J., Finkbeiner, C., Cox, K., Chipman, L. Reh. T.A. Scientific Reports. 2020 Aug 12;10(1):13615. doi: 10.1038/s41598-020-70334-1.

Single-Cell Transcriptomic Comparison of Human Fetal Retina, hPSC-Derived Retinal Organoids, and Long-Term Retinal Cultures. Sridhar A, Hoshino A, Finkbeiner CR, Chitsazan A, Dai L, Haugan AK, Eschenbacher KM, Jackson DL, Trapnell C, Bermingham-McDonogh O, Glass I, Reh TA. Cell Rep. 2020 Feb 4;30(5):1644-1659.e4. doi: 10.1016/j.celrep.2020.01.007. PMID 32023475

STAT Signaling Modifies Ascl1 Chromatin Binding and Limits Neural Regeneration from Muller Glia in Adult Mouse Retina. Jorstad NL, Wilken MS, Todd L, Finkbeiner C, Nakamura P, Radulovich N, Hooper MJ, Chitsazan A, Wilkerson BA, Rieke F, Reh TA. Cell Rep. 2020 Feb 18;30(7):2195-2208.e5. doi: 10.1016/j.celrep.2020.01.075. PMID 32075759

MicroRNAs miR-25, let-7 and miR-124 regulate the neurogenic potential of Müller glia in mice.Wohl SG, Hooper MJ, Reh TA.Development. 2019 Aug 5. pii: dev.179556. doi: 10.1242/dev.179556. [Epub ahead of print]PMID 31383796 [PubMed - as supplied by publisher]Similar articles

Synchrony and asynchrony between an epigenetic clock and developmental timing. Hoshino A, Horvath S, Sridhar A, Chitsazan A, Reh TA.Sci Rep. 2019 Mar 6;9(1):3770. doi: 10.1038/s41598-019-39919-3.PMID 30842553 [PubMed - in process] Free PMC Article Similar articles

Textbooks 
Sanes, Reh, Harris (2005). Development of the Nervous System, 2nd edition. Academic Press;

External links 
 Reh Lab
 Neurobiology and Behavior at the University of Washington 
 Biological Structure at the University of Washington

American biochemists
University of Wisconsin–Madison alumni
Living people
Year of birth missing (living people)